The , founded in 2006 in Japan, is not a university or college in the traditional sense but a new system of education in the local community of Shibuya, Tokyo. The school is led by Yasuaki Sakyo, a 28-year-old ex-accountant. There are no entrance examinations; classes take place in the city's surroundings; and teachers come from all walks of life.

See also

Shibuya, Tokyo
 Alternative education
 Alternative school
 Alternative university
 Autodidacticism
 Democratic school
 Deschooling
 Education
 Free school (disambiguation)
 Gifted education
 School
 Special education
 Unschooling
 John Dewey

References

External links
Official site

Buildings and structures in Shibuya
Universities and colleges in Tokyo
Educational institutions established in 2006
Alternative education
2006 establishments in Japan